Mark Evans (born 16 September 1982) is an English former professional footballer who played as a full back.

Career
Born in Chester, Evans played for Wrexham and Caernarfon Town.

References

1982 births
Living people
English footballers
Wrexham A.F.C. players
Caernarfon Town F.C. players
English Football League players
Association football fullbacks